Jehu Curtis (October 19, 1692 – November 18, 1753) was an American judge who served as a justice of the Colonial Delaware Supreme Court from 1743 until his death in 1753.

Biography
Born in 1692, Curtis moved to New Castle, Delaware in  1743 following an appointment to the Delaware Supreme Court. He became an associate justice in 1745, when Ryves Holt was named the first chief justice. The court that year consisted of three members: Ryves Holt, Curtis, and Nicholas Ridgely. He later became speaker of the Delaware assembly. He served in those two positions until his death in 1753.

An epitaph in memory of Curtis was written by Benjamin Franklin, and said the following:

References

External links

1692 births
1753 deaths
Justices of the Delaware Supreme Court